The Stevens Linen Works Historic District encompasses a 19th-century factory complex associated with the manufacturing of linen and flax fabric in Dudley, Massachusetts.  Its centerpiece is the Stevens Linen Mill, built in the 1860s by Henry Hale Stevens and operated into the mid-20th century.  The mill is a large granite U-shaped building, five stories high, with two seven-story towers at the corners of the U.  The complex includes ten buildings in all, as well as a mill pond and dam.

The mill complex was listed on the National Register of Historic Places in 2010.

See also
National Register of Historic Places listings in Worcester County, Massachusetts

References

National Register of Historic Places in Worcester County, Massachusetts
Buildings and structures in Dudley, Massachusetts
Historic districts on the National Register of Historic Places in Massachusetts